The University of St. Martin (USM) is a university in Philipsburg, Sint Maarten founded in 1989. It closed on October 31, 2017. As of 2018 it has reopened. Its specialization was the hospitality program, through which it offers the UK accredited Higher National Diploma. The USM had about 350 part and full-time students, and more than 500 alumni. Its president was Dr. Francio Guadeloupe.

USM was established in 1989 by Dr. Albert Claudius Wathey and Ambassador Dr. Hushang Ansary as an annex of Johnson & Wales University. Its facilities were destroyed by Hurricane Lenny in 1999, but the university was rebuilt. Its peach and white buildings overlook the Great Salt Pond in picturesque Philipsburg.

By forging a symbiotic relationship with the University of the Virgin Islands (UVI), USM planned to build additional classrooms and dormitories. The agreement, popularly referred to as UVI@USM, made it possible for students on the island to obtain North American accredited BA and MA degrees. The USM also had  articulation agreements with Florida A&M University (FAMU), l’Université de Paris XII: Val-de-Marne, Florida Metropolitan University, Florida State University (FSU), University of South Florida, University of Tampa, Johnson & Wales University (JWU), Berkeley College, Pace University, Monroe College, and Mount Saint Vincent University (MSVU) in Halifax, Canada.

Degree programs

USM offered the following degree programs:

 Associate of Arts in Business with specializations in: Accounting
 Associate of Arts in Business with specializations in: Management
 Associate of Arts in General Liberal Arts
 Associate of Arts in General Liberal Arts (Concentration Math & Science)
 Associate of Applied Arts in Hospitality & Tourism Management
 Bachelor of Arts in Education (with UVI)

USM also offered a Secondary Teaching Certificate program, English as a Second Language (ESL) program, General Equivalency Diploma (GED) Tutorial Program, and the pre-USM Program (College Preparatory Program, which included the GED). Besides these courses through the UVI@USM students also were eligible to enroll in degree programs offered by the University of the Virgin Islands.

References

External links

Universities and colleges in Sint Maarten
Educational institutions established in 1989
1989 establishments in Sint Maarten
Buildings and structures in Philipsburg, Sint Maarten
Educational institutions disestablished in 2017
2017 disestablishments in Sint Maarten